The following is a list of products branded by Nokia.

Current products and services

Products by Nokia Technologies

Wi-Fi routers
 Nokia Wi-Fi Beacon 1
 Nokia Wi-Fi Beacon 3

Digital audio
 Nokia OZO Audio

Smart TVs
Nokia markets smart TVs that run on Android TV.
 Nokia Smart TV 55 inch
 Nokia Smart TV 43 inch

Products by Nokia Networks
Nokia Networks is a multinational data networking and telecommunications equipment company headquartered in Espoo, Finland and wholly owned subsidiary of Nokia Corporation.

The list of products is available here: Nokia Networks - Solutions, Services & Products

HMD Global products 

HMD Global develops devices under the Nokia brand. The company has signed a deal with Nokia allowing it to use the Nokia brand for its devices.

Smartphones 

 Nokia 9 PureView
 Nokia 8.3 5G
 Nokia 8.1 (released in China as Nokia X7)
 Nokia 8 Sirocco
 Nokia 8
 Nokia 7.2
 Nokia X71 (available in Taiwan & China only)
 Nokia 7.1
 Nokia 7 Plus
 Nokia 7 (available in China only)
 Nokia 6.2
 Nokia 6.1 Plus (released in China as Nokia X6)
 Nokia 6.1
 Nokia 6
 Nokia 5.4
 Nokia 5.3
 Nokia 5.1 Plus (released in China as Nokia X5)
 Nokia 5.1
 Nokia 5
 Nokia 4.2
 Nokia 3.4
 Nokia 3.2
 Nokia 3.1 Plus
 Nokia 3.1
 Nokia 3
 Nokia 2.4
 Nokia 2.3
 Nokia 2.2
 Nokia 2.1
 Nokia 2
 Nokia 1.4
 Nokia 1.3
 Nokia 1 Plus
 Nokia 1
 Nokia X30 5G
 Nokia XR20
 Nokia X20
 Nokia X10
 Nokia G60 5G
 Nokia G50
 Nokia G21
 Nokia G20
 Nokia G10
 Nokia C30
 Nokia C20 Plus
 Nokia C20
 Nokia C21
 Nokia C21 Plus
 Nokia C10
 Nokia C5 Endi
 Nokia C3
 Nokia C2 Tava / Tennen
 Nokia C2
 C2 2nd Edition
 Nokia C1
 Nokia C1 Plus
 Nokia C1 2nd Edition
 Nokia C01 Plus
 Nokia C100
 Nokia C200

Tablets

 Nokia T20

Feature phones
 Nokia 8110 4G
 Nokia 8000 4G
Nokia 6310 (2021)
 Nokia 6300 4G
 Nokia 5310 (2020)
 Nokia 3310 (2017)
 Nokia 2720 Flip
 Nokia 800 Tough
 Nokia 230
 Nokia 225 4G
 Nokia 220 4G
 Nokia 216
 Nokia 215 4G
 Nokia 210 (2019)
 Nokia 150 (2020)
 Nokia 150
 Nokia 130 (2017)
 Nokia 125
 Nokia 110 4G
 Nokia 110 (2019)
 Nokia 106 (2018)
 Nokia 105 4G
 Nokia 105 (2019)

Operating systems
 Series 30+
 Series 60
 Series 80
 Series 90
 Smart Feature OS
 KaiOS

Past products and services

Mobile phones
Note:
 Phones in boldface are smartphones
 Status: D = discontinued; P = in production; C = cancelled

The Mobira/Nokia series (1982–1990)
The earliest phones produced by Nokia. These all use 1G networks.

Original series (1992–1999)
The last 1G phones by Nokia.

4-digit series (1992–2010, 2017–Present)

Nokia 1xxx – Ultrabasic series (1992–2010)
The Nokia 1000 series include Nokia's most affordable phones. They are mostly targeted towards developing countries and users who do not require advanced features beyond making calls and SMS text messages, alarm clock, reminders, etc.

Out of all of these phones, the Nokia 1680 classic has the most features.

Nokia 2xxx – Basic series (1994–2010, 2019–Present)
Like the 1000 series, the 2000 series are entry-level phones. However, the 2000 series generally contain more advanced features than the 1000 series; many 2000 series phones feature color screens and some feature cameras, Bluetooth and even A-GPS, GPS such as in the case of the Nokia 2710.

Nokia 3xxx – Expression series (1997–2009, 2017–Present)
The Nokia 3000 series are mostly mid-range phones targeted towards the youth market. Many of these models included youthful designs to appeal to the teen market, unlike the 6000-series which were more conservatively styled to appeal to business users, and the 7000-series which were usually more feminine and mature in design to appeal to fashionable women.

Nokia 4xxx

The Nokia 4000 series was officially skipped as a sign of deference from Nokia towards East Asian customers.

Nokia 5xxx – Active series (1998–2010, 2020–Present)

The Nokia 5000 series is similar in features to the 3000 series, but often contains more features geared toward active individuals. Many of the 5000 series phones feature a rugged construction or contain extra features for music playback.

Nokia 6xxx – Classic Business series (1995–2010, 2020–present)

The Nokia 6000 series is Nokia's largest family of phones. It consists mostly of mid-range to high-end phones containing a high number of features. The 6000 series is notable for their conservative, unisex designs, which make them popular among business users.

Nokia 6136 UMA is the first mobile phone to include Unlicensed Mobile Access. Nokia 6131 NFC is the first mobile phone to include Near Field Communication.

Nokia 7xxx – Fashion and Experimental series (1999–2010)
The Nokia 7000 series is a family of Nokia phones with two uses. Most phones in the 7000 series are targeted towards fashion-conscious users, often with feminine styling to appeal to women. Some phones in this family also test features. The 7000 series are considered to be a more consumer-oriented family of phones when contrasted to the business-oriented 6000 series.  The family is also distinguished from the 3000-series phones as being more mature and female-oriented, while the 3000-series was largely targeted towards the youth market.

The 7110 was the first Nokia phone with a WAP browser. WAP was significantly hyped up during the 1998–2000 Internet boom. However WAP did not meet these expectations and uptake was limited. Another industry first was the flap, which slid from beneath the phone with a push from the release button. Unfortunately the cover was not too durable. The 7110 was also the only phone to feature a navi-roller key.

The 7250i was a slightly improved version of the Nokia 7250. It includes XHTML and OMA Forward lock digital rights management. The phone has exactly the same design as the 7250. This phone is far more popular than the 7250 and has been made available on pre-paid packages and therefore it is very popular amongst youths in the UK and other European countries.

The 7510 Supernova was a phone exclusive to T-Mobile USA. Only some units of this model have Wi-Fi chips with UMA. The Wi-Fi adapter on this phone supports up to WPA2 encryption if present. This phone uses Xpress-On Covers.

The 7650 was the first Series 60 smartphone of Nokia. It was quite basic compared to smartphones, it didn't have MMC slot, but it had a camera.

The 7610 was Nokia's first smartphone featuring a megapixel camera (1,152x864 pixels), and is targeted towards the fashion conscious individual. End-users can also use the 7610 with Nokia Lifeblog. Other pre-installed applications include the Opera and Kodak Photo Sharing. It is notable for its looks, having opposite corners rounded off. It comes with a 64 MB Reduced Size MMC. The main CPU is an ARM compatible chip (ARM4T architecture) running at 123 MHz.

The 7710's 640x320 screen was a touch screen phone.

Nokia 8xxx – Premium series (1996–2007, 2018–present)
This series is characterized by ergonomics and attractiveness. The internals of the phone are similar to those in different series and so on that level offer nothing particularly different, however the physical handset itself offers a level of functionality which appeals to users who focus on ergonomics. The front slide keypad covers offered a pseudo-flip that at the time Nokia were unwilling to make. Materials used increased the cost and hence exclusivity of these handsets.

The only exception to the rule (there are many in different series) is the 82xx and 83xx which were very small and light handsets.

Nokia 9xxx – Communicator series (1996–2007)

The Nokia 9000 series was reserved for the Communicator series, but the last Communicator, the E90 Communicator, was an Eseries phone.

Lettered series: C/E/N/X (2005–2011)

Cseries (2010–2011)

The Nokia Cseries is an affordable series optimized for social networking and sharing. The range includes a mix of feature phones running Series 40 and some smartphones running Symbian.

C1-00 and C2-00 are dual SIM phones, but with Nokia C1-00 both SIM cards cannot be utilized at the same time.

Eseries (2006–2011)

The Nokia Eseries is an enterprise-class series with business-optimized products. They are all smartphones and run on Symbian.

Nseries (2005–2011)

The Nseries are highly advanced smartphones, with strong multimedia and connectivity features and as many other features as possible into one device.

Note:
 Although part of the Nseries, the Nokia N800 and N810 Internet Tablets did not include phone functionality. See the Internet Tablets section.
 The N950 was meant to be the N9-00 with the old N9 'Lankku' being N9-01, however the N9-00 model number was used for the all touch 'Lankku' with the original design being the MeeGo developer-only N950.

Xseries (2009–2011)

The Nokia Xseries targets a young audience with a focus on music and entertainment. Like the Cseries, it is a mix of both Series 30/40/ feature phones and Series 60/Symbian smartphones.

3-digit series Symbian phones (2011–2012)
Since the Nokia 500, Nokia has changed the naming rule for Symbian^3 phones.

Worded series: Asha/Lumia/X (2011–2014)

Asha (2011–2014)

The Nokia Asha series is an affordable series optimized for social networking and sharing, meant for first time users. All phones run Series 40 except Asha 230 and 50x phones, which run on the Nokia Asha platform.

Lumia (2011–2014)

Lumia is a series of smartphones running Windows Phone. It also includes the Nokia Lumia 2520, a Windows RT-powered tablet computer. The series was sold to Microsoft in 2014 who branded these products under the name Microsoft.

Devices with Microsoft branding are not listed here.

X Family (2014)
The Nokia X family is a range of Android smartphones from Nokia. These were the first ever Nokia phones to run on Google's Android OS.

3-digit series feature phones (2011–)
Those phones are entry-level, classic mobile phones platform (with relatively long work on battery). The series was sold in 2014 to Microsoft which continued branding these products under Nokia. Microsoft sold this series to HMD Global in 2016 which also continues branding these products under Nokia.

Other phones

N-Gage – Mobile gaming devices (2003–2004)

PCMCIA Cardphones (1997–2003)

Concept phones

Nokia developed a phone concept, never realised as a working device, in the 2008 Nokia Morph.

Tablets
 Nokia N1

VR cameras
 Nokia OZO

Health
The Digital Health division of Nokia Technologies bought the following personal health devices from Withings in 2016. The division was sold back to Withings in 2018.

Nokia Steel
Nokia Steel HR
Nokia Body/Body+/Body Cardio
Nokia Go
Nokia Sleep
Nokia BPM/BPM+
Nokia Thermo
Nokia Home

Services
After the sale of its mobile devices and services division to Microsoft, all of the below services were either discontinued or spun off.

Consumer services

 Accounts & SSO
 Club Nokia
 Maliit
 Mobile Web Server
 MOSH
 Nokia Accessibility
 Nokia Browser for Symbian
 Nokia Car App
 Nokia Care
 Nokia Conference
 Nokia Business Center
 Nokia Download!
 Nokia Life
 Nokia Lifeblog
 Nokia Mail and Nokia Chat
 Nokia MixRadio
 Nokia Motion Data
 Nokia Motion Monitor
 Nokia network monitor
 Nokia Pure
 Nokia Sensor
 Nokia Sports Tracker
 Nokia Sync
 Nokia Xpress
 OFono
 OTA bitmap
 Ovi
 Plazes
 Smart Messaging
 Twango
 WidSets

Nokia imaging apps

 Nokia Camera
 Nokia Cinemagraph
 Nokia Creative Studio 
 Nokia Glam Me
 Nokia Panorama
 Nokia Refocus
 Nokia Share
 Nokia Smart Shoot
 Nokia Storyteller
 Nokia PhotoBeamer
 Nokia Play To
 Nokia Storyteller
 Nokia Video Director
 Nokia Video Trimmer
 Nokia Video Tuner
 Nokia Video Upload

Navigation apps

 Boston University JobLens
 HERE.com
 HERE Maps
 HERE Map Creator
 HERE Drive
 HERE Transit
 HERE City Lens
 Nokia Internships Lens
 Nokia JobLens
 Nokia Point & Find

Desktop apps

 Nokia Software Recovery Tool
 Nokia Software Updater

 Nokia Suite
 Nokia PC Suite

Humanitarian services

 Nokia Data Gathering
 Nokia Education Delivery
 Nokia Mobile-Mathematics

Developer tools

 Nokia DVLUP
 Python

Websites

 Dopplr
 Nokia Beta Labs
 Nokia Conversations
 Nokia Discussions
 Noknok.tv

Video gaming

 Bounce
 N-Gage
 Nokia Climate Mission
 Nokia Climate Mission 3D
 Nokia Game
 Nokia Modern Mayor
 Snake
 Space Impact

Operating systems
 Series 30
 Series 30+
 Series 40
 Symbian
 S60, formerly Series 60
 Series 80
 Series 90
 Linux-based
 Maemo
 MeeGo
 Nokia Asha platform
 Nokia X platform

Security
IP appliances run Nokia IPSO FreeBSD based operating system, work with Check Point's firewall and VPN products.

 Nokia IP 40
 Nokia IP 130
 Nokia IP 260
 Nokia IP 265
 Nokia IP 330
 Nokia IP 350
 Nokia IP 380
 Nokia IP 390 (EU Only)
 Nokia IP 530
 Nokia IP 710
 Nokia IP 1220
 Nokia IP 1260
 Nokia IP 2250
 Nokia Horizon Manager
 Nokia Network Voyager

In 2004, Nokia began offering their own SSL VPN appliances based on IP Security Platforms and the pre-hardened Nokia IPSO operating system. Client integrity scanning and endpoint security technology was licensed from Positive Networks.

 Nokia 50s
 Nokia 105s
 Nokia 500s

Internet Tablets

Nokia's Internet Tablets were designed for wireless Internet browsing and e-mail functions and did not include phone capabilities. The Nokia N800 and N810 Internet Tablets were also marketed as part of Nseries. See the Nseries section.

 Nokia 770 Internet Tablet
 Nokia N800 Internet Tablet
 Nokia N810 Internet Tablet
 Nokia N810 WiMAX Edition

The Nokia N900, the successor to the N810, has phone capabilities and is not officially marketed as an Internet Tablet, but rather as an actual Nseries smartphone.

ADSL modems

 Nokia M10
 Nokia M1033
 Nokia M112549166
 Nokia MW1122
 Nokia M5123349
 Nokia M200
 Nokia Ni200
 Nokia Ni500

GPS products

 Nokia GPS module LAM-1 for 9210(i)/9290 Communicator 

 Nokia 5140 GPS Cover
 Nokia Bluetooth GPS module LD-1W
 Nokia Bluetooth GPS module LD-3W*
 Nokia Bluetooth GPS Module LD-4W

 Navigation Kit for Nokia 770 Internet Tablet, including LD-3W GPS receiver and software
 Nokia 330 Navigator, that supports an external TMC module.
 Nokia 500 Navigator

WLAN products

 Nokia A020 WLAN access point
 Nokia A021 WLAN access point/router
 Nokia A032 WLAN access point
 Nokia C020 PC card IEEE 802.11 2 Mbit/s, DSSS (produced by Samsung)
 Nokia C021 PC card, with external antenna

 Nokia C110 PC card IEEE 802.11b 11 Mbit/s
 Nokia C111 PC card, with external antennas
 Nokia MW1122 ADSL modem with wireless interface
 Nokia D211 WLAN/GPRS PC card

Digital television

 Nokia DBox
 Nokia DBox2
 Nokia Mediamaster 9200 S
 Nokia Mediamaster 9500 S
 Nokia Mediamaster 9500 C
 Nokia Mediamaster 9600 S
 Nokia Mediamaster 9600 C
 Nokia Mediamaster 9610 S
 Nokia Mediamaster 9800 S
 Nokia Mediamaster 9850 T
 Nokia Mediamaster 9900 S
 Nokia Mediamaster 110 T
 Nokia Mediamaster 210 T
 Nokia Mediamaster 221 T
 Nokia Mediamaster 230 T
 Nokia Mediamaster 260 T
 Nokia Mediamaster 260 C
 Nokia Mediamaster 310 T

Military communications and equipment
Nokia has developed the Sanomalaitejärjestelmä ("Message device system") for the Finnish Defence Forces. It includes:

 Sanomalaite M/90
 Partiosanomalaite
 Keskussanomalaite

For the Finnish Defence forces Nokia manufactured also:

 AN/PRC-77 portable combat-net radio transceiver (under licence, designated LV 217)
 M61 gas mask

Telephone switches

 Nokia DX 200
 Nokia DX 220

 Nokia DX 220 Compact

Computers

Minicomputers
Nokia designed and manufactured a series of minicomputers starting in 1970s. These included the Mikko series of minicomputers intended for use in the finance and banking industry, and the MPS-10 minicomputer that was extensively based the Ada programming language and was widely used in major Finnish banks in the late 1980s.

Personal computers
In the 1980s, Nokia's personal computer division Nokia Data manufactured a series of personal computers by the name of MikroMikko. The MikroMikko series included the following products and product series.

Nokia's PC division was sold to the British computer company ICL in 1991. In 1990, Fujitsu had acquired 80% of ICL plc, which throughout the decade became wholly the part of Fujitsu. Personal computers and servers were marketed under the ICL brand; the Nokia MikroMikko line of compact desktop computers continued to be produced at the Kilo factories in Espoo, Finland. Components, including motherboards and Ethernet network adapters were manufactured locally, until production was moved to Taiwan. Internationally the MikroMikko line was marketed by Fujitsu as the ErgoPro.

In 1999, Fujitsu Siemens Computers was formed as a joint venture between Fujitsu Computers Europe and Siemens Computer Systems, wherein all of ICL's hardware business (except VME mainframes) was absorbed into the joint venture. On 1 April 2009, Fujitsu bought out Siemens' share of the joint venture, and Fujitsu Siemens Computers became Fujitsu Technology Solutions. Fujitsu continues to manufacture computers in Europe, including PC mainboards developed and manufactured in-house.

Mini laptops

On 24 August 2009, Nokia announced that they will be re-entering the PC business with a high-end mini laptop called the Nokia Booklet 3G. It was discontinued a few years later.

Computer displays
Nokia produced CRT and early TFT LCD Multigraph displays for PC and larger systems application. The Nokia Display Products' branded business was sold to ViewSonic in 2000.

Others
During the 1990s, Nokia divested itself of the industries listed below to focus solely on telecommunications.

 Aluminium
 Communications cables
 Capacitors
 Chemicals
 Electricity generation machinery
 Footwear (including Wellington boots)
 Military technology and equipment
 Paper products
 Personal computers
 Plastics
 Robotics
 Televisions
 Tires (car and bicycle)

See also
Nokian Footwear
Nokian Tyres
Nokia phone series
History of mobile phones
List of Motorola products
List of Sony Ericsson products

References

External links
 Nokia – Phone Software Update

Nokia
Nokia services

Nokia
Nokia
Lists of mobile computers